Drop was the debut album by the Scottish band The Shamen, released in 1987 on their own Moksha label.

Track listing

Original UK 1987 release 

 "Something About You"
 "Young 'til Yesterday"
 "Passing Away"
 "World Theatre"
 "Through With You"
 "Where Do You Go"
 "Do What You Will"
 "Happy Days"
 "Through My Window"
 "Velvet Box"
 "I Don't Like"
 "Strange Days Dream"
 "Four Letter Girl"
 "The Other Side"

extra tracks on the UK 1999 CD re-release 

 "It's All Around"
 "Grim Reaper of Love"
 "Christopher Mayhew Says a Lot"
 "Golden Hair"

See also
The Shamen discography

References

1987 debut albums
The Shamen albums